Panna Udvardy was the defending champion but chose not to participate.

Iryna Shymanovich won the title, defeating Irina Khromacheva in the final, 6–2, 5–7, 6–4.

Seeds

Draw

Finals

Top half

Bottom half

References

External Links
Main Draw

Aberto da República - Singles